Guy Tachard (1651 – 1712), also known as Père Tachard, was a French Jesuit missionary and mathematician of the 17th century, who was sent on two occasions to the Kingdom of Siam by Louis XIV. He was born in Marthon, near Angoulême.

In 1680, Tachard went to the Caribbean (Antilles) with Jean II d'Estrées.

Tachard was involved in embassies to Siam, which came as responses to embassies sent by the Siamese King Narai to France in order to obtain an alliance against the Dutch.

First embassy to Siam (1685)
Tachard was sent in 1685 with five other Jesuits under Superior Jean de Fontaney, on a first French embassy to Siam led by Chevalier de Chaumont and François-Timoléon de Choisy, and accompanied by Claude de Forbin. The objective of the Jesuits was to complete a scientific expedition to the Indies and China. Enticed by the Greek Constantine Phaulkon, he returned to France to suggest an alliance with the king of Siam Narai to Louis XIV.

The five other Jesuits Fathers continued to China where they arrived in February 1688: Jean de Fontaney (1643–1710), Joachim Bouvet (1656–1730), Jean-François Gerbillon (1654–1707), Louis Le Comte (1655–1728) and Claude de Visdelou (1656–1737).

The two ships of the embassy returned to France with a Siamese embassy on board, led by the Siamese ambassador Kosa Pan, who was bringing a proposal for an eternal alliance between France and Siam. The embassy stayed in France from June 1686 to March 1687.

Second embassy to Siam (1687)
A second embassy to Siam was sent in March 1687. organized by Colbert, of which Tachard was part again. The embassy consisted in five warships, led by General Desfarges, and was bringing the Siamese embassy home.

The mission was led by Simon de la Loubère and Claude Céberet du Boullay, director of the French East India Company. A young Jesuit had been brought by Tachard: the future composer André Cardinal Destouches. However, apart from the reaffirmation of the 1685 commercial treaty, the mission achieved little else. The disambarkment of French troops in Bangkok and Mergui led to strong nationalistic movements in Siam directed by Phra Petratcha and ultimately resulted in the 1688 Siamese revolution in which king Narai died, Phaulkon was executed, and Phra Petratcha became king. Desfarges negotiated to return with his men to Pondicherry. In the later part of 1689, Desfarges captured the island of Phuket in an attempt to restore French control.

Meanwhile, Tachard returned to France with the title of "Ambassador Extraordinary for the King of Siam", accompanied by Ok-khun Chamnan, and visited the Vatican in January 1688. He and his Siamese embassy met with Pope Innocent XI and translated Narai's letter to him.

Other travels
In 1690, when Tachard tried to return to Siam, a revolution had happened, King Narai was already dead and a new king was on the throne. Tachard had to stop at Pondicherry and return to France without obtaining a permission to enter the country.

In 1699, Tachard again went to Siam, and managed to enter the country this time. He met with Kosa Pan, now Minister of Foreign Affairs and Trade, and the new king Petracha, but the meeting remained purely formal and led to nothing.

Tachard travelled a fifth time to Asia and died in Chandernagor in 1712.

Works
 Tachard, Guy (1688) A relation of the voyage to Siam : performed by six Jesuits sent by the French king, to the Indies and China in the year 1685 
 Tachard, Guy (1689) Second Voyage
 Guy Tachard, Michael Smithies, Choisy, Simon de la Loubère (2000) A Siamese Embassy Lost in Africa 1686: The Odyssey of Ok-khun Chamnan, Silkworm Books, Cape of Good Hope (South Africa),

See also
 France-Thailand relations

Notes

References
 Colvin, Ian D. (2005) The Cape of Adventure: Strange and Notable Discoveries, Perils, Shipwrecks, Kessinger Publishing 
 Gunn, Geoffrey C. (2003) First Globalization: The Eurasian Exchange, 1500–1800 Rowman & Littlefield 
 Smithies, Michael (1999), A Siamese embassy lost in Africa 1686, Silkworm Books, Bangkok, 
 Vongsurat Vat Ana, Raphael (1992): Un jésuite à la cour de Siam, Paris, Ed. France-Empire, 1992, 330pp.

1651 births
1712 deaths
17th-century French Jesuits
17th-century French mathematicians
18th-century French Jesuits
18th-century French mathematicians
People from Charente
17th-century French diplomats
Christian missionaries in the Ayutthaya Kingdom
Catholic clergy scientists
Jesuit scientists